Never Put It in Writing is a 1964 British comedy film directed by Andrew L. Stone and starring Pat Boone, Milo O'Shea, Fidelma Murphy and Reginald Beckwith.

Plot
While in Ireland, an insurance executive learns that somebody else has been promoted over his head. He writes an abusive letter to his bosses, only to discover that he is to be given another important post with the company. He desperately tries to recover the letter before it reaches his bosses.

Cast
 Pat Boone - Steven Cole
 Milo O'Shea - Danny O'Toole
 Fidelma Murphy - Katie O'Connell
 Reginald Beckwith - Lombardi
 Harry Brogan - Mr. Breeden
 Nuala Moiselle - Miss Bull
 John Le Mesurier - Adams
 Sarah Ballantine - Adams' Secretary
 Polly Adams - Receptionist
 Colin Blakely - Oscar
 Ed Devereaux - Pringle
 John Dunbar - Judge
 Bill Foley - Tower Man
 John Gardiner - Security Officer
 Karal Gardner - Young Woman
 Seamus Healy - Sorting Office Foreman
 Liz Lanchbury - Basil's Girl Friend
 John Lynch - Man at elevator
 Julia Nelson - Maid
 Derry Power - Taxi Driver
 Susan Richards - Judge's Wife

Production
The film was originally known as The Letter with Pat Boone's signing announced in June 1963. It was to be done for Seven Arts-MGM (eventually it would be made for Seven Arts-Allied Artists). It was also known as Strictly Personal.

Filming started in Dublin Ireland in July 1963.  The schedule was for two months.

Accident
On the first day of shooting at Shannon Airport, a plane crashed in a camera and the director's van, injuring seven people, one of them seriously. A CL44 plane was taking off while a Proctor plane was taxiing on the runway. The Proctor went off the runway and crashed into the camera van (It was later ruled that the probably cause of the accident was the loss of control by the Proctor due to the effect of the slipstream caused by the C44.)

Andrew Stone and his wife were among those with minor injuries. (Pat Boone was not involved in the accident, he arrived in the country shortly afterwards.) Questions were asked in the Dail over the incident.

Filming continued in Dublin for a number of weeks, with scenes shot at the Dublin Airport, the Gresham Hotel, the Irish Life Building, Jury's Hotel and the Andrew Street Post Office. However the government refused permission for any further low flying sequences. In August the unit moved to London to complete the film.

Release
The world premiere was held at the Adelphi Theatre in Dublin.

Reception
Diabolique magazine said "This is a sluggish, underwritten effort..  the sort of movie that needed songs and color to compensate for the script. It has neither. Boone’s performance is fine."

References

External links

1964 films
British comedy films
1964 comedy films
Films directed by Andrew L. Stone
1960s English-language films
1960s British films